Cameraria fletcherella is a moth of the family Gracillariidae. It is known from Québec and Ontario in Canada and Illinois and Maine in the United States.

The wingspan is 8.5–9 mm.

The larvae feed on Quercus species, including Quercus alba. They mine the leaves of their host plant. The mine has the form of a blotch mine on the upperside of the leaf.

References

Cameraria (moth)

Moths described in 1908
Moths of North America
Lepidoptera of Canada
Taxa named by Annette Frances Braun
Leaf miners
Lepidoptera of the United States